Aníbal Ferreira Fernandes (born 29 February 1968) is a Portuguese slalom canoer.

Career
Fernandes competed in the 1990s. He finished 30th in the K-1 event at the 1996 Summer Olympics in Atlanta.

References
Sports-Reference.com profile

1968 births
Canoeists at the 1996 Summer Olympics
Living people
Olympic canoeists of Portugal
Portuguese male canoeists
Place of birth missing (living people)